KCON may refer to:

 The ICAO code of Concord Municipal Airport, New Hampshire, United States
 KCON (FM), a radio station (92.7 FM) licensed to serve Vilonia, Arkansas, United States
 KASR, a radio station (99.3 FM) licensed to Atkins, Arkansas, which held the call sign KCON from 2015 to 2021
 KCON (AM), a radio station (1230 AM) licensed to Conway, Arkansas, which broadcast from 1950 to 2007
 KCON (music festival), a K-pop convention